Östermalm ("Eastern city-borough")  is a 2.56 km2 large district in central Stockholm, Sweden. With 71,802 inhabitants, it is one of the most populous districts in Stockholm. It is an extremely expensive area, having the highest housing prices in Sweden.

History 
During the reign of the ruler of all of Scandinavia, king Eric of Pomerania in the early 15th century, a royal cowshed/barn was erected on the lands of the village Vädla. Since the town of Stockholm had grown and started to encroach on the borders of that village, there were many complaints about animals causing damage in the town. In the 17th century, the inhabitants of Stockholm were allowed to keep their cattle there. In 1639, parts of the allocated land for the cowshed/barn were put up for development. In 1672 the eastern part became a military exercise field. For the following 200 years, it was the home of some higher officers, but most inhabitants were poor.

A new town plan presented around 1880 implied a grid of streets and avenues that was to become lined with elegant houses, with 4–6 floors. When the plan was implemented, it ended the rustic appearance of the district. The old official name "Ladugårdslandet" (literal meaning "The Barn Land") was replaced with "Östermalm" (literal meaning Eastern Outer City). Since the Crown had been the owner of parts of the district for centuries, a number of official buildings, museums and higher public educational institutions were located in the area. In the 20th century, a large number of embassies, including those of America, Britain, France, Germany, Poland, Thailand, Norway and Malaysia were established in Östermalm.

The Berwaldhallen (1979), home of both the Swedish Radio Symphony Orchestra and the Swedish Radio Choir, is situated on Dag Hammarskjölds väg, Östermalm.

Sites of interest

Buildings 

 Berwaldhallen
 Embassy of the United Kingdom
 Engelbrekt Church
 Kaknästornet
 KTH Royal Institute of Technology
 Maritime Museum
 National Library of Sweden
 Royal Dramatic Theatre, Dramaten
 Sophiahemmet
 Stockholm Olympic Stadium
 St Peter and St Sigfrid's Church, also known as the English Church in Stockholm
 Swedish Armed Forces Headquarters

Neighbourhoods 

Diplomatstaden
Eriksberg
Lärkstaden
Nedre Östermalm
Villastaden
Övre Östermalm

Railway stations 

Karlaplan: metro 13
Stadion: metro 14
Stockholm Östra/Tekniska Högskolan: suburban railway 27, 28, 29 (Roslagsbanan) and metro 14
Östermalmstorg: metro 13, 14

Parks 
 Gustav Adolfsparken
 Humlegården
 Stureparken
 Spiltan
 Tessinparken
 Berzelii Park
 Nobelparken

See also 

 Geography of Stockholm

References 

Districts of Stockholm